Atsushi Matsuura may refer to:

 Atsushi Matsuura (musician) (born 1968), Japanese guitarist
 Atsushi Matsuura (footballer, born 1981) (松浦 敦史), Japanese footballer
 Atsushi Matsuura (footballer, born 1982) (松浦 淳), Japanese footballer